Toni Deniece Seawright (born June 25, 1964) is an American actress and singer-songwriter. In 1987, Seawright made history as the first African American to become Miss Mississippi and was the fourth runner-up in 1988's Miss America pageant.

Life and career
Seawright was born in Pascagoula, Mississippi. She attended Mississippi University for Women in Columbus, Mississippi, where she was the first African American to earn a degree in music at Mississippi University for Women, and majored in Vocal Music and Business at that university. Toni became the first African American to hold a recital in vocal music at MUW as well. She went on to compete for Miss W, the local chapter preliminary to the Miss America Pageant and won. This win put her in the position to compete for the state's Miss Mississippi Pageant in 1987. She went on to capture the coveted crown, making history as the very first African American to ever win. She was the fourth runner-up in the Miss America Pageant, representing the state of Mississippi in 1987.

Seawright sang background vocals for artists such as Teena Marie, Freddie Jackson, Tony Terry, RuPaul, Shaggy, and Laura Branigan. Seawright starred alongside Stephanie Mills and Andre DeShields in the musical The Wiz. Ms. Seawright made her Broadway debut in Street Corner Symphony and Delta Rising, both at the 651 Arts Theater. She also starred in the off-Broadway play Josh (The Black Babe Ruth)/Satchel (Requiem for Racism) at the National Federal Theater (also known as the Abron Arts Center), and Sister Ann in the AUDELCO award-winning play What Would Jesus Do? at the Billie Holiday Theater. Seawright most recently appeared starring as Miss Mamie in "The Widow and Miss Mamie" at the Harlem School of the Arts.

Seawright is currently writing and producing material for her two sons, Qaasim Middleton and Khalil Middleton. The duo have worked with famed producers Full Force as well as Magick Blyss Entertainment, founded by Kevin Hunte, of So You Think You Can Dance fame. Seawright's ex-husband is Keith "Wild Child" Middleton, who starred in STOMP. The two had two sons together, Qaasim and Kahlil. Seawright has guest starred twice on the Nickelodeon musical comedy series The Naked Brothers Band, which co-stars her on-and-off-screen son, Qaasim, who appeared in HBO's The Music in Me. Seawright's younger son, Khalil, starred in Noggin's Jack's Big Music Show. Qaasim was a finalist on Season 14 of American Idol.

On March 16, 2020, she disclosed that she had tested positive for the coronavirus.

Filmography
"Everybody's Cried at Least Once" (The Naked Brothers Band) (2008)
"Mystery Girl" (The Naked Brothers Band) (2008)

References

External links
 

1964 births
Living people
American women singer-songwriters
American television actresses
African-American actresses
African-American songwriters
Miss America 1988 delegates
Miss Mississippi winners
American singer-songwriters
20th-century African-American women singers
21st-century African-American people
21st-century African-American women